Qar may refer to:

Ancient Egyptians
 Qareh (reigned 1770 BC–1760 BC or possibly c. 1710 BC), once misread as Qar, a pharaoh
 Qar (doctor), a doctor during the Sixth Dynasty, which lasted from about 2350 to 2180 BC
 Qar (vizier), a vizier of the Sixth Dynasty
 Qar (Ancient Egyptian official), an official of the 6th Dynasty

Other uses
 Qar, Iran, a village in Kurdistan Province
 Qatari riyal, ISO 4217 currency code
 Quick access recorder, a flight data recorder

Ancient Egyptian given names